Qaleqan (also Romanized as Qāleqān and Qālqān; also known as Ghaleghan) is a village in Kenarrudkhaneh Rural District, in the Central District of Golpayegan County, Isfahan Province, Iran. At the 2006 census, its population was 200, in 67 families.

References 

Populated places in Golpayegan County